The 2015 FIBA Europe Under-18 Championship was the 32nd edition of the FIBA Europe Under-18 Championship. 16 teams participated in the competition, which was held in Volos, Greece, from 23 July to 2 August 2015.

Participating teams

  (3rd place, 2014 FIBA Europe Under-18 Championship Division B)

  (Winners, 2014 FIBA Europe Under-18 Championship Division B)
 

 

  (Runners-up, 2014 FIBA Europe Under-18 Championship Division B)

Venues

First round
In the first round, the sixteen teams were allocated in four groups of four teams each. The top three teams of each group qualified for the Second Round. The last team of each group played in the Classification Group G first, then in the 9th–16th place playoffs.

All times are local – Eastern European Summer Time (UTC+3).

Group A

Group B

Group C

Group D

Second round
Twelve advancing teams from the First Round were allocated in two groups of six teams each. The top four teams of each group advanced to the quarterfinals. The last two teams of each group played in the 9th–16th place playoffs against the teams from the Group G.

Group E

Group F

Classification Group G
The last placed team from each group of the first round competed in a classification round-robin group for lower four seeds in 9th–16th place playoff.

Classification playoffs for 9th – 16th place

Classification games for 9th – 16th place

Classification games for 13th – 16th place

Classification games for 9th – 12th place

Championship playoffs

Quarterfinals

Classification games for 5th – 8th place

Semifinals

Final classification games

Match for 15th place

Match for 13th place

Match for 11th place

Match for 9th place

Match for 7th place

Match for 5th place

Bronze medal match

Final

Final standings

Awards 

All-Tournament Team

 Martynas Varnas
 Edin Atić
 Furkan Korkmaz
 Vassilis Charalampopoulos
 Georgios Papagiannis

References

External links
FIBA official website

FIBA U18 European Championship
2015–16 in European basketball
2015–16 in Greek basketball
International youth basketball competitions hosted by Greece